Claus Jørgensen (born 15 March 1974 in Randers, Midtjylland) is a retired male race walker from Denmark, who was affiliated with MK Nørrevang during his career. His personal best time of 1:22:18 in the 20 kilometres road walk is the Danish record for the event.

He made his first and only Olympic appearance at the 1996 Summer Olympics, where he was 29th in the men's 20 km walk. He also represented Denmark at the World Championships in Athletics in 1997 and 1999. He is a four-time participant in the IAAF World Race Walking Cup.

Achievements

References

IAAF Fact & Figures

1974 births
Living people
Danish male racewalkers
Athletes (track and field) at the 1996 Summer Olympics
Olympic athletes of Denmark
People from Randers
Sportspeople from the Central Denmark Region